Ussara chalcodesma is a species of sedge moth in the genus Ussara. It was described by Edward Meyrick in 1913. It is found in Guyana.

References

Moths described in 1913
Glyphipterigidae